The Western Rams Football Club, Formerly known as the  Rockbank Football Club nicknamed the Rams, is an Australian rules football club affiliated with the Riddell District Football League.

The club is located 29 km north west of Melbourne  in the town of Rockbank.

The current club was reformed in 1992. When they joined the Footscray District League.

The original club played in the Bacchus Marsh Football Association from 1920 until that competition ceased in 1973. They won seven premierships

Senior Premierships
1927, 1953, 1960, 1961, 1964, 1965, 1966.

Books
History of Football in the Bendigo District - John Stoward - 
100 years of Football in the Riddell District - John Stoward

References

Riddell District Football League clubs
Australian rules football clubs established in 1992
1992 establishments in Australia
Sport in the City of Melton
Australian rules football clubs in Victoria (Australia)